Colobothea flavimacula is a species of beetle in the family Cerambycidae. It was described by Voet in 1806. It is known from South America.

References

flavimacula
Beetles described in 1806